The Battle of Zawichost (1205) was a battle fought between Roman the Great of Galicia-Volhynia and Leszek I the White of Lesser Poland, along with his brother, Konrad I of Masovia. After declaring war and invading Lesser Poland, Roman and his forces (druzhina) were ambushed by the Poles in the vicinity of Zawichost by the Vistula (Visla) River. In the tumult that followed, Roman was killed and the Polish victory would lead to Poland's growing power and the weakening of Rus'.

Background 

In the 11th century, Poland and Rus' entered a border dispute and the lands of Lesser Poland and Rus' (called Ruthenia in Latin) were changing hands constantly. In the early Middle Ages, the area of what later would become Galicia was scarcely populated, as the region was settled by Rus' peoples from the east and by Poles from the west. Border-clashes took place in the lands of Przemyśl, Sanok, Drohiczyn and Vladimir-in-Volhynia. The decline of Kievan Rus' gave Poland the opportunity to seize control of the regions. In 1199, an armed campaign led by Leszek the White helped to install Roman the Great on the throne in Vladimir-in-Volhynia. In 1205, however, Roman declared war on Poland. The Polish chronicler, Jan Długosz, tried to give reasons for Roman's declaration of war:

Długosz further explains that before crossing the Polish frontier, Roman sent emissaries to the Bishop of Vladimir and asked for his blessing, as he intended to campaign in Poland for three years. The Bishop declined Roman's gifts and denied him any blessing, explaining that "he cannot bless Roman or his enterprise, since he has previously started unjust and wicked wars and is again embarking on one that is quite unjustified, considering that the Poles have so often exposed their bodies to danger and death to defend the Ruthenians against the barbarians." Roman responded by telling the bishop that he will cut his head off when he returns from his victory.

Battle

In the early spring, Roman invaded the land of Lublin and laid siege to the city. The Polish garrison was successful in defending the city, but the Rus'ian caused great destruction to the local population, as they captured and raped the wives of the knights of Lublin. Leszek then started recruiting a force of knights and peasants from Sandomierz, Kujawy, and Mazovia, which was reinforced with a force of volunteers from Kraków. When Roman learned of the Polish force that was advancing towards him, he raised the siege and advanced deep into Poland by pillaging and threatening with devastation and eradication of the Latin rite. Several bishops and nobles approached Roman and asked for peace, promising to pay compensation; Roman accepted, but continued with the war. He captured some priests and had them shot at with arrows, hoping to have  the location of Leszek disclosed. Długosz gives a detailed description of the battle:

Other accounts mention the same turn of events. The Suzdal Chronicle of the Laurentian Codex) mentions that "Roman of Halych took on Poles and conquered cities. And stopped at the Vistula River with his small druzhina. Poles then attacked and killed him with the druzhina. And people from Halych came, took their dead prince and carried him to Halych and buried him in a church." According to the later "Chronica Poloniae Maioris"<ref name="Yanin"> Valentin Yanin; L. M. Popova,  N. I. Shchaveleva, "Velikaia khronika" o Polshe, Rusi i iMoscow University, [http://www.worldcatlibraries.org/wcpa/top3mset/475f2cee70e26a32a19afeb4da09e526.html OCLC 22324865</ref>) Roman "refuses to pay the tribute to Leszek, bravely challenges him and with amassing the large force unexpectedly invades into the Polish lands. As Leszek found that out, he assembled a small troop rushed to meet him in Zawichost, fiercely attacks him, captures and defeats. Of the Ruthenians, that initially came arrogantly, many were wounded, very many killed with prince Roman, and the others, seeing [that] tried to find the rescue escaping, and many pathetically ended their lives in the Vistula [...] And so happened in 1205 AD."kh sosediakh, XI-XIII vv.] (The Great Chronicle of Poland, Rus' and their neighbours).

Many of the Rus' drowned and many more died at the hands of the local population, as  Polish troops chased them all the way to Vladimir. Few survived the massacre and at the order of Leszek and Konrad, Roman's body was buried in Sandomierz. The two factions came to an agreement and the Russians released all their prisoners and paid 1,000 silver marks to recover the body of Roman, which was then buried in Vladimir.

Aftermath

After his triumph, Leszek's reputation took a positive turn, earning him credibility and the trust of Kraków, which would give him temporary power over the city. Konrad, coming of age, asked for his share of power and at the meditation of their mother and a selected group of aristocrats, the two brothers divide the country under their authority. Rus' turned unstable from its internal conflicts and the country is invaded by Lithuanians, this being the first time the Poles hear of that name. The Ruthenians suffered great casualties, but managed to defeat the invaders. In 1208, the country fell into civil war.

Footnotes

References
Długosz, Jan. The Annals of Jan Długosz 
Dovidnyk z istoriï Ukraïny, 3-Volumes, Article "Roman Mstyslavych" (T.3), Kiev, 1993–1999,  (t. 1),  (t. 2),  (t. 3).
Roman Mstyslavych in Encyclopedia of Ukraine
Roman Mstyslavych in Енциклопедія українознавства (Encyclopedia of Ukrainian studies)'', 3-volumes,  Kiev, 1994, 
"Chronica Poloniae Maioris" (The Chronicle of Greater Poland), Chapter 31 (Russian translation available online)
Ivan Kryp'yakevych, Halych Volynian principality, Kiev, 1984
Suzdal Chronicle of Laurentian Codex (Original text "Тогож̑ лѣт̑ . ходиша кнѧзи Рѧзаньскъıӕ В на Половци и взѧша вежѣ ихъ ❙ Тогож̑ . лѣт̑ . Иде Романъ Галичьскъıи на Лѧхъı и взѧ . в҃ . города Лѧдьскаӕ . и ставшю же ѥму над Вислою рѣкою . и ѿѣха сам̑ в малѣ дружинѣ ѿ полку своѥго . Лѧхове же наѣхавше оубиша и . и дружину ѡколо ѥго избиша . приѣхавше же Галичане взѧша кнѧзѧ своѥго мр҃тва . и несоша и в Галичь . и положиша и въ цр҃кви ст҃ъıӕ Бц҃а")

1205 in Europe
Zawichost
Zawichost
History of Galicia (Eastern Europe)
Zawichost
13th century in Kievan Rus'